

Medal table

Medallists

References

External links

2019 South Asian Games
2019
South Asian Games
Events at the 2019 South Asian Games